Lee Dong-hae (hangul: 이동해; hanja: 李東海; born October 15, 1986) referred as Donghae, is a South Korean singer, dancer, rapper, songwriter, model and actor. He is a member of the boy band Super Junior, also its subgroup Super Junior-M, and Super Junior-D&E, as well as the dance-centered group SM The Performance. He is one of the first four Korean artists to appear on Chinese postage stamps.

Songs

References

Lists of songs by songwriters